BBTS Bielsko-Biała SA is a professional men's volleyball club based in Bielsko-Biała in southern Poland, founded in 1999. They compete in the Polish PlusLiga.

Honours
 Polish Cup
Winners (1): 1993–94

Team
As of 2022–23 season

Coaching staff

Players

See also

References

External links
 Official website 
 Team profile at PlusLiga.pl 
 Team profile at Volleybox.net

Polish volleyball clubs
Sport in Bielsko-Biała
Volleyball clubs established in 1999
1999 establishments in Poland